John Howard Dadley Day (born 24 December 1955) is a West Australian state politician. He was a Liberal member of the Western Australian Legislative Assembly from 1993 to 2017.

Personal life 
Day was born on 24 December 1955 in Middle Swan, Western Australia to John and Myfanwy Day. His father, who survived the Second Battle of El Alamein, died when Day was 17 years old.

Attending Guildford Grammar School, Day later completed a Bachelor of Science, and a Bachelor of Dental Science at the University of Western Australia going on to work at the Perth Dental Hospital as well as other clinical situations including Canning Vale Prison. He later set up a private practice with his sister Elizabeth working in such places as Wundowie, Glen Forrest and Beverley.

Parliament 
Winning pre-selection for the seat of Darling Range to the east of Perth following the retirement of sitting member Ian Thompson, Day won the seat in the 1993 state election. He successfully held the seat in the 1996, 2001 and 2005 state elections. In 2007 as a result of an electoral distribution under the Electoral Act 1907 (WA) all electoral boundaries in Western Australia were redrawn. The electoral district of Darling Range was redrawn and a new electoral district of Kalamunda was created containing a large portion of the previous electoral district of Darling Range. Day held this newly formed seat in the 2008 and 2013.

Court Government 

In February 1993, a state election brought the Liberal Party and their coalition partner, the Nationals, to power with a stable majority to form the 34th parliament of W.A. under Premier Richard Court. Day held the following ministerial positions in the Court Government;

Time in Opposition 
In the 2001 state election, Day came very close to losing his seat after an 18.8% swing against him; but he won by 137 votes. However the Liberal Party was forced into opposition when the Labor Party took the majority. During the Liberal Party's time in opposition Day held the following positions;

Barnett Government 

The 2008 state general election on 6 September resulted in a hung parliament with no party gaining a majority, but saw Day elected to the newly formed seat of Kalamunda. Ultimately, the Liberals were able to form government in the 38th parliament of W.A. in alliance with the WA Nationals, supported by three independents. Led by Premier Colin Barnett, Day held the following ministerial portfolios;

He was also the Minister for Environment and Minister for Youth from 22 November to 14 December 2010, having temporarily taken over Donna Faragher's portfolios, and served as Leader of the House for 4 years from 21 March 2013 to 11 March 2017.

Day retired from politics after the 2017 Western Australian state election held on Saturday 11 March 2017 in which the Liberal Party was defeated by the Labor opposition, led by Opposition Leader Mark McGowan.
In 2018 he was appointed to the Board of the Art Gallery of Western Australia, and in 2019 to the Board of the State Library of Western Australia, of which he is Chairman.

References 

1955 births
Living people
Members of the Western Australian Legislative Assembly
Liberal Party of Australia members of the Parliament of Western Australia
People educated at Guildford Grammar School
Australian dentists
Politicians from Perth, Western Australia
21st-century Australian politicians